Apr. 30 - Eastern Orthodox Church calendar - May 2.

All fixed commemorations below celebrated on May 14 by Orthodox Churches on the Old Calendar.

For May 1st, Orthodox Churches on the Old Calendar commemorate the Saints listed on April 18.

Saints
 Prophet Jeremiah (c. 655 – 586 BC)
 Martyr Philosophos at Alexandria (252)
 Martyr Sabbas
 Venerable Hieromartyr Batas of Nisibis (Bata the Persian) (c. 364)
 Venerable Isidora the Fool-for-Christ, of Tabennisi, Egypt (c. 365)
 New Monk-martyr Romanus of Raqqa (780)
 St. Michael, ascetic of Chalcedon (8th-9th century)
 Saint Symeon of Syracuse (or of Mount Sinai or Trier) (1035)

Pre-Schism Western saints
 Martyr Andeolus of Smyrna, a subdeacon from Smyrna sent to France by St Polycarp, martyred near Viviers on the Rhône (208)
 Martyrs Orentius and Patientia, husband and wife who lived at Loret near Huesca in Spain, parents of St. Laurence the Martyr (240)
 Martyrs Acius (Ache) and Aceolus (Acheul), the former a deacon, the latter a subdeacon, martyred near Amiens in France under Diocletian (303)
 Saint Grata of Bergamo, a holy woman from Bergamo in Italy, zealous in securing Christian burial for the bodies of the martyrs (c. 307)
 Saint Agapetos (Amator), Bishop of Auxerre and Confessor (418)
 Saint Orentius of Auch (or Orientius), a hermit in the Lavendan valley near Tarbes in France, Bishop of Auch (Augusta Ausciorum) for over 40 years (c. 439)
 Saint Corentin, Bishop of Quimper (460)
 Saint Brioc, Abbot of St. Brieuc (c. 502)
 Martyr Sigismund, king of Burgundy (524)
 Saint Marcul, Hieromonk of Corbeny, founder of a monastery of hermits on the Egyptian model in Nanteuil in France (c. 558)
 Saint Ceallach (Kellach), a disciple of St Kieran of Clonmacnoise, became Bishop of Killala in Ireland, ended his life as a hermit and may have been martyred (6th century)
 Saint Asaph, Bishop in North Wales (c. 600)
 Saint Aredius of Gap (Arigius, Arey), Bishop of Gap in France for twenty years (604)
 Saint Bertha of Val d'Or, martyr, founder and abbess of Avenay in the diocese of Châlons-sur-Marne (680)
 Martyr Evermarus of Tongres, pilgrim murdered by robbers at Rousson, near Tongres, Belgium (c. 700)
 Saint Théodard, Archbishop of Narbonne (893)
 Saint Benedict of Szkalka, a hermit on Mount Zobor in Hungary, disciple of St. Andrew Zorard, renowned for his asceticism, murdered by robbers (1012)

Post-Schism Orthodox saints
 Saint Tamar of Georgia, Queen (1213) 
 Saint Paphnutius of Borovsk, Abbot (1477)
 Hieromartyr Macarius of Kiev, Metropolitan of Kiev (1497)
 St. Zosimas, bishop of Kumurdo (15th century)
 Saint Gerasimus of Boldinsk, abbot (1554)
 Saint Panaretus of Cyprus, archbishop (1791)
 New Martyrs Euthymius, Ignatius (1814), and Acacius (1815) of Mount Athos 
 Saint Nicephorus of Chios, monk (1821)
 New Martyr Mary of Crete (Mary of Mirambelos) (1826)
 Schemamonk Luke of Glinsk Hermitage (1898)

New martyrs and confessors
 Virgin-martyr Nina (Kuznyetsova), new martyr of Vologda (1938)

Other commemorations
 Icon of the Most Holy Theotokos "Unexpected Joy" (“Neochikuvana Radist”) from Andronikov Monastery.
 "Myrrh-Bearing" Icon of the Mother of God of Tsarevokokshaisk (in the province of Kazan) (1647)
 Translation of the relics of Saint Walburga, Abbess of Heidenheim

Icon gallery

Notes

References

Sources
 May 14, 2011 / May 1, 2011 (Church Calendar). HOLY TRINITY RUSSIAN ORTHODOX CHURCH (A parish of the Patriarchate of Moscow)
 May 1/14. Orthodox Calendar (PRAVOSLAVIE.RU)
 May 1. OCA - The Lives of the Saints.
 Dr. Alexander Roman. May. Calendar of Ukrainian Orthodox Saints (Ukrainian Orthodoxy - Українське Православ'я).
 AN ENGLISH ORTHODOX CALENDAR.
 May 1. Latin Saints of the Orthodox Patriarchate of Rome.
 The Roman Martyrology. Transl. by the Archbishop of Baltimore. Last Edition, According to the Copy Printed at Rome in 1914. Revised Edition, with the Imprimatur of His Eminence Cardinal Gibbons. Baltimore: John Murphy Company, 1916. pp. 123–124.
 Rev. Richard Stanton. A Menology of England and Wales, or, Brief Memorials of the Ancient British and English Saints Arranged According to the Calendar, Together with the Martyrs of the 16th and 17th Centuries. London: Burns & Oates, 1892. pp. 190–192.
Greek Sources
 Great Synaxaristes:  1 ΜΑΪΟΥ. ΜΕΓΑΣ ΣΥΝΑΞΑΡΙΣΤΗΣ.
  Συναξαριστής. 1 Μαΐου. ECCLESIA.GR. (H ΕΚΚΛΗΣΙΑ ΤΗΣ ΕΛΛΑΔΟΣ). 
Russian Sources
  14 мая (1 мая). Православная Энциклопедия под редакцией Патриарха Московского и всея Руси Кирилла (электронная версия). (Orthodox Encyclopedia - Pravenc.ru).
  1 мая (ст.ст.) 14 мая 2013 (нов. ст.). Русская Православная Церковь Отдел внешних церковных связей. (DECR).

May in the Eastern Orthodox calendar